WFRX (1300 AM) is a radio station licensed to West Frankfort, Illinois, United States. The station airs a sports format, and is owned by Withers Broadcasting, through Withers Broadcasting of Southern Illinois, LLC.  It is the first radio station in the United States to play a Beatles record on air.

References

External links
WFRX's website

FRX
Sports radio stations in the United States
Radio stations established in 1951
1951 establishments in Illinois